Jalan Bukit Pelindung, Federal Route 424, is a federal road in Kuantan, Pahang, Malaysia.

The Kilometre Zero is located at Jalan Tengku Muhamad junctions.

At most sections, the Federal Route 424 was built under the JKR R5 road standard, with a speed limit of 90 km/h.

List of junctions

References

Malaysian Federal Roads